The Bahing are a subset of the Indigenous Kirant ethnic group, which is located widely in Okhaldhunga and Solukhumbu District. They can be found in some of the villages like Bulaadi, Chisopani, Moli, Pankhu, Bhadaure, Aapsowra, Rangadeep, Bigutar, Mamkha, Narayasthan, Baruneshowe, Ratmate, Waksa, Lekh Kharka of the Okhaldhunga District, and Nechabatase, Salyan of Solukhumbu & in some other districts of eastern Nepal. 

Their language, also named "Bahing lo, Pai lo, Radu lo, Wai lo, Procha Lo", belongs to the family of Kiranti languages, a subgroup of Tibeto-Burman. They have two main festivals: Hong and Susu.  The Bahing also worship Nature.

References

Ethnic groups in Nepal
Himalayan peoples